Jorge Armando Porras  (born 25 December 1959 in Medellín) is a former Colombian football player.

Club career
Porras played for Atlético Nacional, América de Cali, Independiente Medellín and Once Caldas, appearing in more than 300 Colombian league matches during his professional career.

International career
Porras made 20 appearances for the senior Colombia national football team from 1980 to 1987, including participating in eight qualifying matches for the 1982 and 1986 FIFA World Cups and the 1987 Copa América.

He also played for Colombia at the 1980 Olympic Games in Moscow.

References

1959 births
Living people
Footballers from Medellín
Colombian footballers
Colombia international footballers
Footballers at the 1980 Summer Olympics
Olympic footballers of Colombia
1987 Copa América players
Categoría Primera A players
Atlético Nacional footballers
América de Cali footballers
Independiente Medellín footballers
Once Caldas footballers
Association football defenders